is a group of volcanic rocks in the Philippine Sea about  south of Tokyo and  south-southeast of Aogashima, in the south portion of the Izu archipelago, Japan. The rocks were discovered by the French corvette Bayonnaise in 1850, while surveying the islands south of Tokyo Bay.

Geography

The caldera is known to have erupted in 1869–1871, 1896, 1906, 1915, 1934, 1946, 1952–1955, 1957–1960, 1970, and 1988. The last known submarine eruption of the caldera was in 2023, which discolored the local water.

The following day, an eruption killed 31 researchers and crewmen aboard the Maritime Safety Agency survey ship No.5 Kaiyo-Maru. The island reappeared on 11 October, sinking again on 11 March 1954 and reappeared one more time between 5 April and 3 September 1954.

Vegetation is sparse among the Bayonnaise Rocks. The islands are a resting place for migratory birds. Located in the Kuroshio Current, the area has abundant sea life, and is popular with sports fishermen.

See also

 Izu Islands
 Desert island
 List of islands
 List of islands in Japan

References

External links

  - Japan Meteorological Agency
 
 Bayonnaise Rocks Volcano - volcanolive.com

Izu Islands
Uninhabited islands of Japan
Volcanoes of Japan
Islands of Tokyo